Cercyon lateralis is a species of water scavenger beetle in the family Hydrophilidae. It is found in North America and Europe.

References

Further reading

External links

 

Hydrophilidae
Articles created by Qbugbot
Beetles described in 1802